Giovanni Benelli (12 May 1921 – 26 October 1982) was an Italian Cardinal of the Roman Catholic Church. He served as Archbishop of Florence from 1977 until his death. He was made a cardinal in 1977.

Biography

Early life and ordination
Giovanni Benelli was born 12 May 1921 in Poggiole di Vernio, Tuscany, to Luigi and Maria (née Simoni) Benelli. Baptised the day after his birth, on 13 May, he was the youngest of his parents' five surviving children, and his uncle Guido was a revered Franciscan friar. Benelli entered the Seminary of Pistoia in 1931, and then attended the Pontifical Gregorian University and the Pontifical Ecclesiastical Academy in Rome. He received the clerical tonsure on 23 December 1939, and was eventually ordained a priest on 31 October 1943 by Bishop Giuseppe Debernardi. At age 22, he had not yet reached the canonical age of 24 for priestly ordination, and therefore was given a special dispensation. Benelli finished his studies at the Gregorian in 1947, and also undertook pastoral work in Rome until 1950.

Roman Curia
His abilities were noticed by the Church, becoming private secretary in 1946 to Deputy Secretary of State Giovanni Battista Montini. Benelli joined the diplomatic service in 1948, and was raised to the rank of Monsignor on 16 July 1950. He served as the Secretary of nunciatures to Ireland (1950–1953) and to France (1953–1960). Benelli was then appointed to the following posts: auditor of nunciature to Brazil (1960–1962), counsellor of nunciature to Spain (1962–1965), and permanent observer of Holy See to UNESCO in Paris (1965–1966).

Archbishop
On 11 June 1966, he was appointed Titular Archbishop of Tusuro and Apostolic Nuncio to Senegal, as well as apostolic delegate to Western Africa. Benelli received his episcopal consecration on the following 11 September from Cardinal Secretary of State Amleto Giovanni Cicognani, with Archbishop Pietro Sigismondi and Bishop Mario Longo Dorni serving as co-consecrators. These assignments gave him a deep interest in the battle against illiteracy and the Church's work for peace and economic development.

Within a year, on 29 June 1967, he entered the Roman Curia as Substitute, or Deputy, of the Secretariat of State. As Cicognani was too old to fulfill most of his duties, they fell to Benelli. He worked closely with his former master, now Pope Paul VI, and remained in this post for ten years.

Some referred to him as "the Berlin Wall" and the "Vatican Kissinger" in the Vatican for his aggressive and almost authoritarian tenure as Substitute of the Secretariat of State, including having the more senior Curialists channel business through him.

Benelli was promoted to Archbishop of Florence on 3 June 1977, and was created Cardinal-Priest of Santa Prisca by Paul VI in the consistory of 27 June 1977.

Papabile
Upon the deaths of Popes Paul VI and John Paul I, Benelli was considered the leading moderate candidate to succeed them, because of his close ties with Paul and his Italian heritage. He was one of the cardinal electors in the conclaves of August and October 1978. During the August conclave, Benelli supported Albino Luciani, the eventual winner, who became Pope John Paul I. In the October conclave in 1978, he was one of two leading Italian candidates in a tie with Giuseppe Siri to succeed John Paul I, but was defeated with fellow Italian candidate, Siri, on 16 October by Karol Wojtyla, who became Pope John Paul II.

Later life and death
Benelli continued in his capacity of Cardinal and Archbishop of Florence until 26 October 1982 when he died of a sudden heart attack in Florence, at age 61. His funeral Mass was celebrated by Cicognani's successor, Agostino Casaroli, and his remains were buried in Santa Maria del Fiore cathedral.

See also 
 The Last Confession, a stage play where Benelli is the lead character.

References

Notes

Bibliography 
(1976) Pancorbo, Luis: "Monseñor Benelli" en "Diálogos italianos". pp. 343–353. Sedmay, Madrid.  (in Spanish)

External links

Catholic-Hierarchy 
Cardinals of the Holy Roman Church
Biography

1921 births
1982 deaths
People from the Province of Prato
20th-century Italian cardinals
Apostolic Nuncios to Senegal
Permanent Observers of the Holy See to the United Nations
20th-century Italian Roman Catholic archbishops
Roman Catholic archbishops of Florence
Pontifical Gregorian University alumni
Pontifical Ecclesiastical Academy alumni
Cardinals created by Pope Paul VI